ICMM was founded in 2001, as a CEO-led leadership organization, to improve sustainable development performance in the mining and metals industry.

Sustainable Development 
In late 1998 a small group of mining industry CEOs came together to question how the sector could grow its contribution to sustainable development. Through the World Business Council for Sustainable Development (WBCSD), they commissioned the International Institute for Environment and Development (IIED) to explore the role of the sector in the transition to sustainable development. Over the course of two years, a team of IIED researchers reviewed existing initiatives and materials, and consulted more than 150 separate individuals and organisations to understand their views of how the minerals sector's contribution could be improved. This process came to be known as the Mining, Minerals and Sustainable Development Project (MMSD).

What emerged was an agenda for change that would enhance mining and metals’ contribution to sustainable development. MMSD concluded in May 2002 with the signing of the Toronto Declaration, where it was agreed that ICMM should take over responsibilities from MMSD for the mainstreaming of sustainable development for the mining and metals industry.

ICMM's Mining Principles 
All company members are represented on ICMM's Council by their CEOs and on various committees by nominated representatives, where they work collaboratively to enhance the contribution of mining and metals to sustainable development. This commitment is enshrined in ICMM's company member admission processes, which is overseen by an independent third-party review panel.

Since the inception of ICMM in 2001, the expectations of company members have evolved from an informal set of expectations to a more prescriptive set of commitments. In 2003, ICMM published the first iteration of its 10 Mining Principles for sustainable development. These Mining Principles were updated in 2020 to include a series of performance expectations that company members are expected to comply with, and again in 2022 to include more specific wording on diversity, equity, and inclusion (DEI). Although ICMM strives for unanimity, it recognises that on occasion there may be reasonable grounds why individual companies may not be able to commit to their positions at the time of approval. That is why, under a policy known as ‘conform or explain’ introduced in 2021, ICMM will adopt a common position when at least 75 percent of members are able to commit to implementation. Any company members that are unable to do so at the time have 12 months to either adopt the position or publicly explain the reasons why they cannot.

ICMM's 10 Mining Principles comprise:

 Ethical Business
 Decision Making
 Human Rights
 Risk Management
 Health & Safety
 Environmental Performance
 Conservation of Biodiversity
 Responsible Production
 Social Performance
 Stakeholder Engagement

Since 2003, ICMM has also developed a number of Position Statements to articulate additional commitments on a number of critical industry challenges. Position Statements are endorsed by the ICMM Council and include specific commitments that members must implement, alongside all other performance expectations.

 Mining and Protected Areas (2003)
 Mercury Risk Management (2009)
 Mining Partnerships for Development (2010)
 Indigenous Peoples and Mining (2013)
 Tailings Governance Framework (2016)
 Water Stewardship (2017)
 Climate Change (2021)
 Transparency of Mineral Revenues (2021)

Members
ICMM estimates that it brings together a third of the global metals and mining industry to drive leadership, action and innovation for a safe, just and sustainable world. Company members of ICMM comprise

In addition to ICMM's company members, it counts over 35 national and commodity associations as members.

ICMM activities 
ICMM's Strategy and Action Plan 2022–2024 involves 12 major initiatives across four key areas:

 Environmental Resilience – delivering our net zero commitment announced in 2021; further improving water management at site-level and maximising the industry's contribution to a nature positive future.
 Social Performance – playing a leading role in creating diverse, equitable and inclusive workplaces and societies; further strengthening approaches to upholding and enhancing human rights, particularly the rights and interests of Indigenous Peoples, and supporting the resilience of communities to thrive in a changing, climate-impacted world.
 Governance and Transparency – leading the convergence of ESG standards; supporting the maximisation of benefits of mining for host countries through disclosure and transparency; enhancing practices for responsible and sustainable mine closure and driving implementation of the Global Industry Standard on Tailings Management across the industry.
 Innovation – accelerating innovation in tailings to reduce waste; supporting the development of a circular economy; and pursuing a step-change in eliminating fatalities towards the goal of zero harm.

References

External links
Official ICMM website

International environmental organizations
International organisations based in London
Mining
Mining trade associations
2001 establishments in England